General Sir Andrew Skeen, KCB, KCIE, CMG (20 January 1873 – 18 February 1935) served in the British Indian Army, rising to the position of Chief of the General Staff in India.

Military career
Skeen was commissioned into the King's Own Scottish Borderers as a second lieutenant on 5 December 1891, and promoted to lieutenant on 2 October 1893. He served on the North-West Frontier of India from 1897 to 1898 taking part in operations of the Malakand Field Force. He was deployed to China in 1900, and promoted to captain on 10 July 1901 while serving in the 24th Punjabis. From December 1902 he was in East Africa where he took part in operations in Somaliland until 1904.

He served in World War I as a Staff officer to General William Birdwood, Australian and New Zealand Army Corps taking part in the Gallipoli Campaign in 1915. He was mentioned in dispatches with regard to reinforcing Anzac Cove, in full view and reach of the enemy, prior to the Battle of Sari Bair. {{quote|"The preparation of the ambush was treated as a simple matter by the services therein engaged, and yet I much doubt whether any more pregnant enterprise than this of landing so large a force under the very eyes of the enemy, and of keeping them concealed there three days, is recorded in the annals of war." – General Ian Standish Monteith Hamilton.}}

For his service at Gallipoli he was awarded CMG and French Croix de Guerre. He went on to be Director of Military Operations at India Army HQ in 1916 and then Deputy Chief of General Staff, Indian Army in 1917.

He became Commander of the 3rd (Abbottabad) Indian Infantry Brigade and then Commander of the Kohat Kurram Force in which capacity he took part in the Third Anglo-Afghan War in 1919.

He served in Waziristan on the North-West Frontier of India from 1919 to 1920 as Commander, Tochi and Derajat Columns. He was then appointed Commander, Kohat District, India in 1921, Commander, Peshawar District, India in 1922 and General Officer Commanding-in-Chief, Southern Command, India in 1923. Finally he became Chief of the General Staff in India in 1924, and appointed Knight Commander of the Order of the Bath in the 1925 New Year Honours, before retiring in 1929.

References

Publications
Skeen, Gen Sir A., Passing It On: Short Talks on Tribal Fighting on the Northwest Frontier of India'', 4th ed (Gale & Polden, 1939). The 4th edition has an additional chapter (by Maj D.B. Mackenzie) on lessons learned from Waziristan 1937.

 

|-
 

1873 births
1935 deaths
British Indian Army generals
Knights Commander of the Order of the Bath
Companions of the Order of St Michael and St George
Knights Commander of the Order of the Indian Empire
Indian Army generals of World War I
British military personnel of the Malakand Frontier War
British military personnel of the Boxer Rebellion
British military personnel of the Third Anglo-Afghan War
Recipients of the Croix de Guerre 1914–1918 (France)
British military personnel of the Waziristan Campaign